The 2012 Furman Paladins team represented Furman University as a member of the Southern Conference (SoCon) during the 2012 NCAA Division I FCS football season. Led by second-year head coach Bruce Fowler, the Paladins compiled an overall record of 3–8 with a mark of 2–6 in conference play, placing seventh in the SoCon. Furman played home games at Paladin Stadium in Greenville, South Carolina.

Schedule

References

Furman
Furman Paladins football seasons
Furman Paladins football